The Samyang 8mm F3.5 UMC Fish-Eye CS II is a fisheye photographic lens using the stereographic projection and is designed for crop factor APS-C DSLRs.  It is made in South Korea by Samyang Optics and marketed under several brand names besides Samyang, including Bower, Falcon, Polar, Pro-Optic, Rokinon, Vivitar and Walimex Pro (Walser GmbH & Co. KG). There are versions for the Canon EF, Fujifilm X, Nikon F, MFT, Pentax K, Samsung NX, Sony E, Sony α/Minolta A mounts.

The lens uses manual focus only.  For most versions of the lens, the aperture must be set manually. For Nikon there are versions with and without a chip to communicate aperture information with the camera.  Versions with the chip (model AE8M-N) can set the aperture automatically.  The CS II version of the lens has a removable lens hood.

See also
Samyang 8mm F2.8 UMC Fisheye

References

External links

008
Fisheye lenses